Express 1 is a high-speed catamaran operated by Molslinjen between Rønne and Ystad.
Along with its sister ship, the Express 2, they are the world's largest diesel-powered catamarans.

History
Express 1 was built in 2009 at the Incat Yards in Tasmania, Australia as MGC 66 for MGC Chartering Limited. Upon completion the vessel was chartered to French ferry operator LD Lines and renamed Norman Arrow.

In June 2009 the Norman Arrow entered service between Dover and Boulogne. For the 2010 season the Norman Arrow was transferred to the Portsmouth - Le Havre route.

On 28 August 2010 the Norman Arrow hit a mooring dolphin whilst berthing in Le Havre, resulting in structural damage to the vessel. The Norman Arrow sailed to Brest for repairs.

References

Ships built by Incat
Incat high-speed craft
2008 ships